Elocution is the study of formal speaking in pronunciation, grammar, style, and tone as well as the idea and practice of effective speech and its forms. It stems from the idea that while communication is symbolic, sounds are final and compelling. It came into popularity in England in the eighteenth and nineteenth centuries and in America during the nineteenth century. It benefitted both men and women in different ways but overall the concept was there to teach both how to become better, more persuasive speakers, standardize errors in spoken and written English, as well as the beginnings of the formulation of argument were discussed here.

History
In Western classical rhetoric, elocution was one of the five core disciplines of pronunciation, which was the art of delivering speeches. Orators were trained not only on proper diction, but on the proper use of gestures, stance, and dress. There was a movement in the eighteenth century to standardize English writing and speaking and elocution was a part of this movement, with the help of Sheridan and Walker. (Another area of rhetoric, elocutio, was unrelated to elocution and, instead, concerned the style of writing proper to discourse.)

Elocution emerged as a formal discipline during the eighteenth century. One of its important figures was Thomas Sheridan, actor and father of Richard Brinsley Sheridan. Thomas Sheridan's lectures on elocution, collected in Lectures on Elocution (1762) and his Lectures on Reading (1775), provided directions for marking and reading aloud passages from literature. Another actor, John Walker, published his two-volume Elements of Elocution in 1781, which provided detailed instruction on voice control, gestures, pronunciation, and emphasis. Sheridan had a lot of ground to cover with having to be one of the first to establish great ideas about this subject, speaking more vaguely on subjects, but promising to explain them further. While Walker's approach was an attempt to put in place rules and a system on the correct form of elocution. A reason these books gained traction was that both authors took a scientific approach and made rhetorically-built arguments in a time period where manual-styled, scientific, how-to books were popular. Including these were "over four hundred editions" of grammar and "two hundred fifteen editions" of dictionary books that became available to the public in the 1700s, "five times more ... after 1750" than prior. This was because education held a heavier weight in social status so therefore upper-class, higher educated people were reading these books as well as whoever else wanted to have the appearance of more gentleman or lady-like class than they may have been from.

With the publication of these works and similar ones, elocution gained wider public interest. While training on proper speaking had been an important part of private education for many centuries, the rise in the nineteenth century of a middle class in Western countries (and the corresponding rise of public education) led to great interest in the teaching of elocution, and it became a staple of the school curriculum. American students of elocution drew selections from what were popularly deemed "Speakers." By the end of the century, several Speaker texts circulated throughout the United States, including McGuffey's New Juvenile Speaker, the Manual of Elocution and Reading, the Star Speaker, and the popular Delsarte Speaker. Some of these texts even included pictorial depictions of body movements and gestures to augment written descriptions.

The era of the elocution movement, defined by the likes of Sheridan and Walker, evolved in the early and mid-1800s into what is called the scientific movement of elocution, defined in the early period by James Rush's The Philosophy of the Human Voice (1827) and Richard Whately's Elements of Rhetoric (1828), and in the later period by Alexander Melville Bell's A New Elucidation of Principles of Elocution (1849) and Visible Speech (1867).

In her recent book The Elocutionists: Women, Music, and the Spoken Word (University of Illinois Press, 2017), Marian Wilson Kimber addresses the oft-forgotten, female-dominated genre of elocution set to musical accompaniment in the United States.

In his recent article, "The Artful Woman": Mrs. Ellis and the Domestication of Elocution" (Rhetoric Review 39, 2020), Don Paul Abbott writes about Sarah Stickney Ellis and her work Young Ladies Reader (1845) and its impact on women's lives in the nineteenth century. Ellis' work, as well as others that were published around the same time, had compilations of other authors' works. Ellis had intended her work to be for other women, therefore she compiled a number of women's writings in her work, as did other authors more or less dependent on specific ones. This was still during a time when it was well believed that women and men lived in "separate spheres". Ellis had not gone to the lengths that Sheridan and Walker did when it came to developing theories and rules for elocution but she made it clear through her writing that she believed that the spoken word was powerful and mastering it "deserves the attention" of ladies all around. She comes to this idea of "The Artful Woman", a concept of a lady who is able to persuade others, specifically mentioning her husband. According to Abbott, Ellis believes that she had empowered women in their own sphere, so much so he argues in his journal article that it is possible she delayed women stepping "from the parlor to the podium".

Sample curriculum

An example can be seen in the Table of Contents of McGuffey's New Sixth Eclectic Reader of 1857:

Principles of Elocution
I. Articulation
II. Inflections
III. Accent and Emphasis
IV. Instructions for Reading Verse
V. The Voice
VI. Gesture

New Sixth Reader. Exercises in Articulation
Exercise I. — The Grotto of Antiparos
Exercise II. — The Thunder Storm
Exercise III. — Description of a Storm
IV. Hymn to the Night-Wind
V. — The Cataract of Lodore
On Inflection
VI. — Industry Necessary for the Orator
VII. — The Old House Clock [etc.]

Modern elocution 
Jason Munsell, a communications and speech professor, theorizes that part of elocution is strategic movement and visuals. This is suggested due to a major portion of communication occurring digitally. In his journal article from 2011, he wrote that the writings of elocution during the mid-nineteenth century aided women in becoming rhetorically empowered. Munsell, when examining a bulletin from the time period, makes an argument that elocution may have been the beginning of the rhetoric concept of Literary theory, "The bulletin also explained that the function of elocution was to discover possible meanings of a reading, to learn how to express those meanings, then to discover the intended purpose."

See also
 Diction
 Orthoepy
 Philology

Other forms
 Homiletics, Christian rhetoric
 Pronunciation, classical elocution
 Tajwid, Qur'anic elocution

References

Further reading
Abbott, Don Paul (27 January 2020). "'The Artful Woman': Mrs. Ellis and the Domestication of Elocution." Rhetoric Review Vol 39, Issue 1. Taylor & Francis Online, 1–15.
Kimber, Marian Wilson (2017). The Elocutionists: Women, Music and the Spoken Word. University of Illinois Press. 

Spoel, Philippa M. (Winter 2001). "Rereading the Elocutionists: The Rhetoric of Thomas Sheridan's A Course of Lectures on Elocution and John Walker's Elements of Elocution. Rhetorica: A Journal of the History of Rhetoric Vol. 19 No. 1. University of the California Press, 49–91.

External links
Digital library of old American textbooks
An article on oratory in 19th century education
Digital facsimile of A.A. Griffith's Lessons in Elocution, 1865
 Digital Book  Lessons in Elocution by William Scott, 1820

Grammar
Language education
Phonetics
Rhetoric
Speech
Tone (linguistics)